Divine knowledge may refer to:
 Omniscience
 light (theology), cf. Enlightenment (spiritual)
 Prophecy